Jon David Ritchie (born September 4, 1974) is an American former professional American football fullback in the National Football League, who is currently a sports radio host. He started for seven seasons in the NFL, playing for the Oakland Raiders and the Philadelphia Eagles. Despite only 15 rushing attempts in his career, Ritchie built a reputation with his blue collar work ethic as being one of the best blocking fullbacks in the NFL. Ritchie won the Travers award for best male high school athlete.

Ritchie co-hosted The Artie Lange Show alongside comedian Artie Lange from 2013 to 2014. He currently co-hosts the 94.1 WIP Morning Show, a sports talk radio show in Philadelphia, with Joe DeCamara, as well as James Seltzer.

Early life
Ritchie attended Cumberland Valley High School near Carlisle, Pennsylvania from 1989 to 1993. He led his high school football team to the state championship in 1992.

College career
Ritchie was rated the #1 fullback recruit in the nation. A Pennsylvania native, Ritchie was recruited hard by Penn State and their coach Joe Paterno.  However, Ritchie wanted to avoid the pressure of playing for is home-state team. 

Upon graduation, Ritchie attended Michigan as a freshman and sophomore. At Michigan, he played as a true freshman. During his career at Michigan, he rushed for 120 yards and caught two passes for 13 yards. Then in 1995 he transferred to Stanford where he played as a junior and senior. At Stanford, he first started as an inside linebacker, but switched to fullback. He rushed 17 times for 95 yards and received nine passes for 80 yards and two touchdowns. He is a member of Delta Tau Delta International Fraternity.

Professional career
Ritchie was drafted in the third round (63rd overall) of the 1998 NFL Draft by the Oakland Raiders. He started for the Raiders for five seasons. Raiders running back Charlie Garner posted three seasons of more than 1,700 yards from scrimmage with Ritchie as his teammate after rushing for just 381 yards the year before he joined Oakland. The Raiders led the league in total yardage in 2002, en route to an AFC Championship and appearance in Super Bowl XXXVII, where Oakland lost to the Tampa Bay Buccaneers.

In 2003, Ritchie signed a two-year contract with the Philadelphia Eagles. He had expressed an interest in playing closer to his hometown, which was just 90 miles west of Philadelphia, so his friends and family could watch and attend his games. In 2003, the Eagles running back tandem of Brian Westbrook, Duce Staley, Correll Buckhalter and quarterback Donovan McNabb rushed for 2,015 yards and 23 touchdowns behind Ritchie. Ritchie was also second on the team in touchdown receptions in 2003 (behind Westbrook, and ahead of Staley), with the Eagles running backs playing a larger role in the passing game than the lackluster receiving core.

Four games into the 2004 season, Ritchie suffered a season-ending knee injury. He re-signed with the Eagles on a one-year contract for the 2005 season while recovering from his injury. Though Ritchie had been taking first team reps as the starting fullback during training camp, he was released by the team during final cuts. He retired from playing prior to the 2006 season and began a career in sports media.

NFL career statistics

Media career
Ritchie worked as the color commentator for NFL Europa games broadcast on NFL Network, and did NFL commentary for the local ABC station, WHTM-TV. He has also done analyst work with CN8 for college games.
 
Ritchie appeared as a contributor on ESPN including shows such as First Take, Outside the Lines, and College Football Overdrive for ESPNews. In September 2010, he started hosting a college football Saturday edition of SportsNation with Michelle Beadle. In 2013, he became co-host on the nationally syndicated late night radio program The Artie Lange Show. The show was syndicated throughout the country on terrestrial radio and Sirius XM, the show was also broadcast live on Directv's Audience network nightly until April 28, 2014.

Ritchie then worked as an on-air personality and analyst for the NBC Sports Network and DirecTV, appearing every week on NBCSN's Fantasy Football Live and DirecTV's Fantasy Zone Channel on Sundays. He was also a contributor to ComcastSportsNet's regional NFL coverage and NFL coverage on NBC Radio.

In 2016, Ritchie began co-hosting the WIP Midday Show show with Joe DeCamara on 94.1 WIP Sports Radio in Philadelphia. In 2023, DeCamara and Ritchie were promoted to the WIP Morning Show.

Personal life
After retiring from the NFL, Ritchie moved back to his hometown of Mechanicsburg, Pennsylvania where he helped coach the varsity football team for which he played, the Cumberland Valley Eagles. He spoke at the baccalaureate for the class of 2005 and the class of 2008.

State Senate campaign
Ritchie announced in February 2016 that he would run for the Pennsylvania State Senate to replace the retiring Pat Vance in Pennsylvania's 31st Senatorial District. He touted himself as a candidate who would lower taxes, fight for pension reform, and help to revitalize Pennsylvania's education system. In a four-way race for the Republican nomination, Ritchie finished second to Mike Regan. Ritchie actually won the Democratic nomination by write-in votes despite not campaigning for it, but ultimately decided not to run in the general election.

References

External links
 

1974 births
Living people
American football fullbacks
Michigan Wolverines football players
Oakland Raiders players
Philadelphia Eagles players
Stanford Cardinal football players
Players of American football from Harrisburg, Pennsylvania
People from Mechanicsburg, Pennsylvania